Mark Deering (6 March 1900 – 26 April 1973) was an Irish Fine Gael politician. A farmer, he first stood for election at the 1951 general election but was not successful. He was elected to Dáil Éireann as a Fine Gael Teachta Dála (TD) for the Wicklow constituency at the 1953 by-election caused by the death of Thomas Brennan of Fianna Fáil. 

He was re-elected at the 1954 general election but lost his seat at the 1957 general election. He was an unsuccessful candidate at the 1965 general election.

References

1900 births
1972 deaths
Fine Gael TDs
Members of the 14th Dáil
Members of the 15th Dáil
Politicians from County Wicklow
Irish farmers